The 2017 Campeonato Capixaba Série A is the 101st season of the top professional football league in Espírito Santo. It was won by Itapemirim for the first time when they defeated Doze 4-3 over aggregate.

Public Safety
In February 2017, the police of Espírito Santo went on strike. In response, the Federação de Futebol do Estado do Espírito Santo, which runs all competitions in Espírito Santo, postponed the competition for over a month, from February 4 to March 8. This resulted in the competition ending two weeks later than planned.

Format
First Round
Unlike 2016, all ten teams play each other once.
The top four teams go to the Semi-Finals.
The bottom four teams are relegated to the 2018 Campeonato Capixaba Série B. 
Final Rounds
The teams are paired according to their ranking:
1st vs. 4th
2nd vs. 3rd
The games are decided over two legs, with the better team hosting the second leg.
If one of the semi-finals are tied, the teams with the better ranking move on to the final.
The two winners move on to the final, also played over two legs.
The team with the better record in the first round hosts the second leg.
Qualification
The top team not already playing in Série A, Série B, or Série C, or already assured qualification to Série D qualifies for the 2018 Campeonato Brasileiro Série D
The winner qualifies for the 2018 Copa do Brasil.
The winner qualifies for the 2018 Copa Verde.

Teams

First round

Final Rounds

Semi-finals

Itapemirim win 3-1 on aggregate.

'''Doze win, being the team with the better record, after a 0-0 draw on aggregate.

Final

Itapemirim win 4-3 on aggregate.
Itapemirim win the 2017 Campeonato Capixaba

Top Scorers

Itapemirim qualifies for the 2018 Campeonato Brasileiro Série D.Itapemirim qualifies for the 2018 Copa Do Brasil.Itapemirim qualifies for the 2018 Copa Verde.

References

2017 in Brazilian football
Campeonato Capixaba seasons